The large moth family Gelechiidae contains the following genera:

Bactrolopha
Bactropaltis
Bagdadia
Barticeja
Baryzancla
Batenia
Battaristis
Belovalva
Beltheca
Besciva
Bilobata
Blastovalva
Brachmia
Brachypsaltis
Bruchiana
Bryotropha

References

 Natural History Museum Lepidoptera genus database

Gelechiidae
Gelechiid